Faronta was a genus of moths of the family Noctuidae. It is now considered a synonym of Dargida.

Former species
 Faronta albilinea (Hübner, [1821])
 Faronta aleada Smith, 1908
 Faronta amoena (Draudt, 1924)
 Faronta confundibilis Köhler, 1973
 Faronta diffusa (Walker, 1856)
 Faronta disticta (Druce, 1908)
 Faronta exoul (Walker, 1856)
 Faronta multistria (Köhler, 1947)
 Faronta napali (Köhler, 1959)
 Faronta quadrannulata (Morrison, 1875)
 Faronta rubripennis (Grote & Robinson, 1870)
 Faronta terrapictalis Buckett, 1967, [1969]
 Faronta tetera (Smith, 1902)

References
Natural History Museum Lepidoptera genus database
Faronta at funet

Hadeninae